Take-Offs and Put-Ons is the second album and first solo album by American comedian George Carlin. Recorded in Detroit, Michigan at the Roostertail on November 25, 26 and 27, 1966, the album was first released in 1967 as RCA Victor LSP-3772 and was nominated for a Grammy award later that year. Many of the routines and characters were already familiar to audiences due to the comedian's performances on television programs such as The Mike Douglas Show and The Merv Griffin Show. The album was reissued in 1972 with new cover art on the budget-priced RCA Camden label (CAS-2566); In 1975, the album was reissued again in the mid-priced RCA 'Pure Gold' series (ANL1-1086). The album was re-released on compact disc in 1997, on the One Way Records label. An edit of "Wonderful WINO"  was released as a single (with "Al Sleet, Your Hippy Dippy Weatherman" on the b-side, edited from "The Newscast").

Track listing

Side one
 Wonderful WINO (Top-40 Disc Jockey) – 5:43
 Commercials – 8:22
 Daytime Television – 9:34

Side two
 The Newscast – 7:29
 The Indian Sergeant – 5:08

Notes

External links
 George Carlin's Official Website

1966 debut albums
George Carlin live albums
Stand-up comedy albums
RCA Victor albums
1960s comedy albums
1960s spoken word albums